The House of Carlson was a Swedish family of high nobility associated with the Swedish Royal Family, and who held the counties of Börringe and Lindholmen as fiefs.

History 
The House of Carlson began with Gustaf Carlson, the illegitimate eldest son of king Charles X Gustav of Sweden and his mistress Märta Allertz. The young Gustaf was given the two estates of Börringe and Lindholmen by his father. Gustaf was in 1675 elevated to Countly status alongside his two estates, by his half-brother king Charles XI. He was styled as "His Highness, Count Gustaf Carlson, Lord of Börringe and Lindholmen". When he later went on to serve as a confidant of the English monarch William III, he was granted the style of Sir. When Gustaf of Carlson eventually died in 1708 the House of Carlson died out, with his only heir dying only a couple of days after birth.

References 

 
Swedish noble families